Joseph Grimeland (2 January 1916 – 10 October 2002) was a Norwegian sculptor.

Biography
Grimeland was born in Kristiania (now Oslo), Norway. He was the son of Bertel Andreas Grimeland (1875–1966) and Margaret Thomas (1889–1963).
He attended private school at Grimelandskolen in Asker which his father had founded and where he served as head master. In 1933, he entered  the Norwegian National Academy of Fine Arts  (Statens kunstakademi)  where he had  Wilhelm Rasmussen as an instructor.  He debuted at the Autumn Exhibition (Høstutstillingen) in 1935.

Among his sculptures were Naken gutt from 1939  at the National Gallery of Norway  and Oslopiken from 1951 at the Oslo City Hall. After the end of  German occupation of Norway during World War II, he designed a number of war memorial. In 1946, he created a war monument (Krigsminnesmerket) in granite at Nordre Skøyen in Oslo.  In 1980, his monument to Norwegian ships and sailors (Krigsseilermonumentet) was unveiled at  Bygdøy peninsula in the district of Frogner of Oslo.

During the course of his career, he portrayed Hieronymus Heyerdahl  (1950), Ole Reistad (1958), Bokken Lasson (1962), Anders Jahre (1975), Sigrid Undset (1977), Kirsten Flagstad (1981), Arnulf Øverland (1968) and Olaf Bull (1989).  He also made stage decorations for Nationaltheatret. He chaired the Norwegian Sculptors' Association from 1974 to 1978.

Honors
King's Medal of Merit (Kongens fortjenstmedalje) in gold (1950)
Order of St. Olav (1993) 
Ingeborg og Per Palle Storms ærespris  (1997)

References

Other sources
Stig Andersen, Odd Nerdrum, Per Ung (1996) Joseph Grimeland (Oslo: Gyldendal)

Related reading
Grimeland, Joseph; Øistein Thurmann-Nielsen (1965) Moderne kunst - hvorhen? (Oslo  Dreyer)

1916 births
2002 deaths
Artists from Oslo
Oslo National Academy of the Arts alumni
20th-century Norwegian sculptors
Recipients of the St. Olav's Medal
Recipients of the King's Medal of Merit in gold